The Essential Eric Carmen is a two-disc compilation album that contain 15 tracks each by American soft rock singer, songwriter, guitarist and keyboardist Eric Carmen, released on March 25, 2014. It is part of Sony BMG's Essential series of compilation albums and includes tracks from Carmen’s solo output, as well as tracks from his Raspberries days and Cyrus Erie. The tracks consist of some of Carmen's biggest hits and popular album 1968 as leader of American band Cyrus Erie through his 1984 release Eric Carmen.

Background  

The Essential Eric Carmen spans Carmen's 45 year career from his time with the Raspberries through his solo career.

Reception 

Tony Peters from Iconfetch says: "Most music today is consumed through lousy quality ear buds or computer speakers. Yet, once in a while, a remaster comes along that sounds so good, you'll want to dust off that old CD player to get the full experience. The Essential Eric Carmen is the first two-disc collection to span the talented singer/songwriter's entire career. And, it's one of those rare CDs where the sonic improvement is so noticeable, you'll find yourself hearing things you never heard before.

Stephen Thomas Erlewine from AllMusic says: "That means that this collection does indeed have almost everything of note, from the big Raspberries hits 'Go All the Way' and 'Overnight Sensation (Hit Record),' through the '70s solo smashes 'All by Myself' and 'Never Gonna Fall in Love Again,' through those late-'80s sensations 'Hungry Eyes' and 'Make Me Lose Control.'"

David Luhrssen from Shepherd Express wrote: "The real surprise on The Essential Eric Carmen is the opening 1969 track from his first recording act, "Cyrus Erie," with its excellent approximation of the mid-'60s Beatles' sound.

The Second Disc says: "The first track on Legacy Recordings' new double-disc anthology The Essential Eric Carmen (Arista/Legacy 88883745522) is titled, appropriately enough, "Get the Message." And the message relayed by its 30 nuggets comes through loud and clear: whether as power pop prince, classically-inspired MOR balladeer or nostalgic yet contemporary eighties rocker, Eric Carmen had the goods."

Track listing

Disc one

Disc two

Notes

Personnel 
Eric Carmen – lead vocals, guitar, keyboards, bass guitar, backing vocals, piano
Dan Hrdlicka – lead guitar, backing vocals
Steve Knill – bass, backing vocals
Richard Reising – synthesizer, organ, backing vocals
Dwight Krueger, Michael McBride – drums, percussion, backing vocals
Jackie Kelso – uncredited flute solo on "Never Gonna Fall in Love Again"
Hugh McCracken – slide guitar solo on "All By Myself
 Richard Reising – synthesizers, harpsichord, guitars, backing vocals 
 George Sipl – keyboards, synthesizers, organ, backing vocals 
 Dan Hrdlicka – guitars, backing vocals 
 Steve Knill – bass, backing vocals
 Dwight Krueger – drums, percussion, backing vocals 
 Michael McBride – drums, percussion, backing vocals

Raspberries
Wally Bryson – lead guitar, backing and lead vocals (Disc 1) (tracks 2-5)
Dave Smalley – rhythm guitar, backing and lead vocals (Disc 1) (tracks 2-5)
Jim Bonfanti –  drums, backing vocals (Disc 1) (tracks 2-5)

References 

Eric Carmen albums
2014 compilation albums
Arista Records compilation albums
Legacy Recordings compilation albums
Sony Music compilation albums
Albums produced by Jimmy Ienner